Scott Valentine (born May 2, 1991) is a Canadian professional ice hockey defenceman. He is currently playing for HC Bolzano of the ICE Hockey League (ICEHL). Valentine was selected by the Anaheim Ducks in the sixth round (166th overall) of the 2009 NHL Entry Draft. He was born in Metcalfe, Ontario (now Ottawa, Ontario).

Playing career
Valentine played major junior hockey in the Ontario Hockey League (OHL). On September 30, 2011, the Nashville Predators of the National Hockey League (NHL) signed Valentine as a free agent to a three-year, entry level contract. For the duration of his entry-level contract Valentine was assigned to AHL affiliate, the Milwaukee Admirals.

Unsigned by the Predators, and released to free agency, Valentine began the 2014–15 season, with the Idaho Steelheads of the ECHL. After posting six assists in 12 games with the Steelheads, Valentine was signed by AHL affiliate, the Texas Stars, for the remainder of the season on November 19, 2014.

As a free agent, Valentine left North America to sign a contract during the 2015–16 season in Germany with Krefeld Pinguine of the DEL on October 4, 2015.

Valentine opted to continue in the German league the following season, signing as a free agent with rivals, Augsburger Panther to a one-year deal on May 13, 2016.

Valentine played six seasons on the blueline in Augsburg, before leaving as a free agent to sign a one-year deal with Italian based, HC Bolzano of the ICEHL, on July 27, 2022.

References

External links

1991 births
Living people
Anaheim Ducks draft picks
Augsburger Panther players
Bolzano HC players
Canadian expatriate ice hockey players in Germany
Canadian ice hockey defencemen
Ice hockey people from Ottawa
Idaho Steelheads (ECHL) players
Krefeld Pinguine players
London Knights players
Milwaukee Admirals players
Oshawa Generals players
Texas Stars players